Earnest Lynde was an American politician from Recluse, Wyoming who served a single term in the Wyoming House of Representatives, representing Campbell County from 1939 to 1941 as a Democrat in the 25th Wyoming Legislature. Lynde represented Campbell County alongside Republican R. B. Marquiss.

Lynde was married. Her son, John Lynde, died at the age of 18 in Rapid City, South Dakota following complications from a mastoid operation.

References

Year of birth missing
Year of death missing
20th-century American women politicians
Democratic Party members of the Wyoming House of Representatives
Women state legislators in Wyoming
People from Campbell County, Wyoming